David Calvin Gardner (born August 23, 1952) is a Canadian former professional ice hockey centre who played 350 National Hockey League (NHL) games for the Montreal Canadiens, St. Louis Blues, California Golden Seals, Cleveland Barons and Philadelphia Flyers.

Career
Gardner was drafted eighth overall by Montreal in the 1972 NHL Amateur Draft from the Toronto Marlboros after having won the Red Tilson Trophy as the Ontario Hockey League's Most Outstanding Player. As a youth, Gardner played in the 1964 Quebec International Pee-Wee Hockey Tournament with a minor ice hockey team from Leaside.

Personal life 
Gardner is the son of Cal Gardner and elder brother of Paul Gardner. Gardner is the father of Canadian-Swiss player Ryan Gardner.

Career statistics

See also
Notable families in the NHL

References

External links
 

1952 births
Living people
Binghamton Dusters players
California Golden Seals players
Canadian ice hockey centres
Cleveland Barons (NHL) players
Dallas Black Hawks players
Ice hockey people from Toronto
Maine Mariners players
Montreal Canadiens draft picks
Montreal Canadiens players
Nova Scotia Voyageurs players
National Hockey League first-round draft picks
Philadelphia Flyers players
Springfield Indians players
St. Louis Blues players
Toronto Marlboros players
Tulsa Oilers (1964–1984) players
Canadian expatriate ice hockey players in the United States